The penning was the dominant currency of the Norwegian coin system in the period 995-1387.

Minted in Norway by the kings of Norway from Olaf Tryggvason (995-1000) and up to Olaf Haakonsson (1380-1387), it remained as a unit of account in the kingdom until 1513. It was introduced the year 995 in the image of the Anglo-Saxon coinage, and was the first and oldest currency of Norway. The coin system was later adapted in both Sweden and Denmark.

The name lives on in the North Germanic languages in the contracted form of the plural, penger/pengar, which means money.

In the old Norwegian weight system it entered into units as ertog, øre and mark. Penning amended standard on several occasions through the Middle Ages. Both coin image, inscriptions, size, weight, and the silver content could vary considerably.

The penning was minted in imitation of the pennies, pfennig and deniers issued elsewhere in Europe. However, although based on these coins, the accounting system was distinct, with different systems operating in different regions. All used the öre which was worth 1/8 of a mark or 3 örtugs.

Value Relations between mark, øre, örtug og penning:
 1 mark = 8 øre = 24 ertogs = 240 pennings
	   1 øre = 3  ertogs = 30  pennings
	           1  ertog  = 10  pennings
			       1   penning

Historical timeline of Norwegian currency

See also 

 Swedish penning, its former Swedish interpretation
 penny, its British equivalent
 denier, its former French equivalent
 pfennig, its former German equivalent

References 

Currencies of Europe
Currencies of Norway